Patrick Joseph Schloss is an American rehabilitation psychologist, educator, professor and university administrator. He served as president of Northern State University in Aberdeen, South Dakota, from 2004 to 2007, and president of Valdosta State University in Valdosta, Georgia from 2008 to 2011. Previously at Bloomsburg University of Pennsylvania, he served as acting president in 2004, provost and vice president of academic affairs from 2000 to 2003, assistant vice president for academic affairs and the dean of graduate studies, research and libraries from 1994 to 2000. Before that, Schloss was a professor of special education at the University of Missouri and Pennsylvania State University.

Early life and education 
Patrick Joseph Schloss was born in Illinois. His father was a football coach in the Chicago area. His maternal grandparents emigrated from Lebanon and his paternal grandfather emigrated from Russia.

Schloss attended Illinois State University in Normal, Illinois, and graduated with a Bachelor of Science degree in 1974. He earned a Master of Science degree in counseling two years later. In 1979, he completed his Ph.D. in rehabilitation psychology and special education at the University of Wisconsin–Madison.

Career 
Schloss joined Pennsylvania State University in 1982 and served until 1987 as the professor-in-charge of special education. In 1988, he became the professor and chair of the University of Missouri's Department of Special Education – a position he held until 1992. Starting in 1990, Schloss was also the director of research at the University of Missouri College of Education.

In 1994, Schloss joined the administration of Bloomsburg University of Pennsylvania in Bloomsburg, Pennsylvania. He was assistant vice president for academic affairs and the dean of graduate studies, research and libraries, before he became interim provost in May 2000. He was officially appointed as provost and vice president of academic affairs at Bloomsburg University in April 2001. During his tenure, Bloomsburg University increased enrollment by more than 12%, began offering an undergraduate engineering program, and awarded its first doctoral degrees. For his last year at the university, Schloss served as acting president.

Schloss moved to Aberdeen, South Dakota, when he was appointed in March 2004 to serve as president of Northern State University (NSU). He succeeded John Hilpert to become the 15th president of NSU. When Schloss took over at NSU, the university had an enrollment of 2,300, down from 2,600 the year before. With the lowest enrollment among South Dakota's six public universities, only four of the six dormitories on the campus were in use. By fall 2005, enrollment was up 10.6%. Schloss had implemented a plan called Margin of Excellence with the aim to "attract new students, retain students and enhance the school's academic reputation". In 2007, NSU was ranked second by U.S. News & World Report among public undergraduate colleges and universities in the Midwest.

In June 2008, Schloss was appointed the eighth president of Valdosta State University in Valdosta, Georgia. In September of the same year, Schloss announced that the university would be modifying its policies on free speech to address complaints by the Foundation for Individual Rights in Education. The foundation subsequently removed the university from its Red Alert list. During his three-year tenure, enrollment at the university increased by 1,600 students. Schloss served as president of Valdosta State until summer 2011 when he stepped down to take a position in the University System of Georgia (USG), the parent institution of Valdosta State. Schloss would help with an initiative to improve graduation and retention rates at the USG.

During his decades-long academic career, Schloss wrote 15 books and more than 100 articles for peer reviewed journals. He has also served as editor or consulting editor for several journals.

Personal life 
Schloss was married to his first wife, Cynthia Nelson Schloss, for 30 years and they had three children before she died of cancer in 2003. He married Maureen Smith-Schloss in 2004. They live in Valdosta, Georgia.

Selected bibliography

Books

Chapters and articles

References

External links 

 

21st-century American psychologists
Bloomsburg University of Pennsylvania
Northern State University faculty
Valdosta State University faculty
University of Missouri faculty
Year of birth missing (living people)
Living people